David Nevins Sr. (December 12, 1809 – March 19, 1881) was a wealthy New England industrialist.

Biography
David Nevins was born in Salem, New Hampshire on December 12, 1809. His family moved to Methuen, Massachusetts when he was very young. He owned the Pemberton Mill in nearby Lawrence, Massachusetts, which collapsed on January 10, 1860, killing around 100 people.

He married Eliza S. Coffin in 1838, and they had two children – Henry Coffin Nevins and David Nevins Jr.

He died in Methuen on March 19, 1881.

Nevins is the namesake of the Nevins Memorial Library. An author wrote, "The public spirit and generosity of the Nevins family seems to have no bounds in the town in which they made their home".

References

1809 births
1881 deaths
People from Methuen, Massachusetts
American industrialists
19th-century American businesspeople